Richard O'Reilly (1746–1818) was an Irish prelate of the Roman Catholic Church. He served as the Archbishop of Armagh and Primate of All Ireland from 1787 to 1818.

Biography
After his education at the Propaganda College in Rome, he was the Parish Priest of Kilcock and Vicar General of Kildare and Leighlin. He was appointed the Titular Bishop of Oropus and Coadjutor of Kildare and Leighlin on 20 June 1781. The following year, he was appointed the Coadjutor and Administrator of the Metropolitan see of Armagh on 26 February 1782. On the death of Archbishop Anthony Blake of Armagh on 11 November 1787, O'Reilly automatically succeeded as archbishop and primate.

He died in office on 31 January 1818, aged 72, and was buried in Drogheda.

References

Bibliography

 
 

1746 births
1818 deaths
19th-century Roman Catholic archbishops in Ireland
Roman Catholic archbishops of Armagh